Radio Science is a quarterly peer-reviewed scientific journal published by Wiley-Blackwell on behalf of the American Geophysical Union and co-sponsored by the International Union of Radio Science. It contains original scientific contributions on radio-frequency electromagnetic propagation and its applications (radio science). Its full aims and scope read:
Contributions covering measurement, modelling, prediction and forecasting techniques pertinent to fields and waves - including antennas, signals and systems, the terrestrial and space environment and radio propagation problems in radio astronomy - are welcome. Contributions may address propagation through, interaction with, and remote sensing of structures, geophysical media, plasmas, and materials, as well as the application of radio frequency electromagnetic techniques to remote sensing of the Earth and other bodies in the solar system.
Volumes for the years 1966 through 1968 were issued by the Environmental Science Services Administration (ESSA), the precursor of the National Oceanic and Atmospheric Administration (NOAA), in cooperation with the United States National Committee of the International Scientific Radio Union.

See also
 Advances in Radio Science

References

External links 
 

Publications established in 1966
English-language journals
American Geophysical Union academic journals
Wiley (publisher) academic journals
Wiley-Blackwell academic journals
Engineering journals
Physics journals